Mare Smythii  (Latin for "Smyth's Sea") is a lunar mare located along the equator on the easternmost edge of the Moon's near side. It is named for the 19th-century British astronomer William Henry Smyth. The Smythii basin where the mare is located is of the Pre-Nectarian epoch, while the surrounding features are of the Nectarian system. The mare material, which makes up the floor of the mare, is a low alumina basalt, and consists of Upper Imbrian basalt covered by Eratosthenian basalt. Features observed within the basin include wrinkle ridges, submerged "ghost" craters, domes, crater chains, and rilles.

The overall shape of the mare is circular, likely the result of a large impact. Further bombardment followed, creating the irregular shape. Subsequent volcanism laid down the mare material. As a result of this sequence, only the northeastern portion and a smaller area in the western central contain significant regions of smooth mare material. The remaining surface is more hummocky with a higher albedo. The geological features suggest that lava flowed from the southeast and west toward the northeast, where it accumulated in the lowest parts of the basin. Mare Smythii contains a relatively high number of craters with fractured floors, including the noticeably unusual crater Haldane. This is probably a result of uplift from injection of magma below the mare.

The crater Neper is located to the north of the mare. This crater makes up part of the southern rim of Mare Marginis. Just off to the northwest of the mare are the craters Schubert and Schubert B. The dark mare-filled crater at the southern edge of Smythii is the crater Kästner.

Gallery

References

Smythii
Smythii
Smythii
Smythii